"Blue Jeans" is a song by American singer-songwriter Lana Del Rey for her studio album Born to Die (2012). It was released on March 30, 2012, by Interscope Records as the third single from the record. Produced by Emile Haynie, the song was written by Del Rey, Haynie, and Dan Heath. It is a downtempo ballad with hip hop influences. Charting across Europe and Asia, "Blue Jeans" reached the top 10 in Belgium, Poland, and Israel. Three music videos were created for the song. The first was self-produced and the second shows Del Rey stands at a microphone in a bland room, accompanied by an electric guitarist. The third, which is the official one, was shot and directed by Yoann Lemoine, featuring film noir elements and crocodiles. A controversial performance of the song on Saturday Night Live placed Del Rey under scrutiny and polarized opinion, though the song itself received acclaim from critics.

Background and composition

Originally put out as a double A-side with her debut song, "Video Games", it was also put as a B-side to the title track and second single, "Born to Die". It was later released as the third official single from Born to Die. Official remixes of "Blue Jeans" include ones by D/R/U/G/S, Blood Orange, Kris Menace, and RAC.

"Blue Jeans" is a trip hop ballad; Jon Dolan from Rolling Stone labelled the song a trip hop version of ZZ Top's "Sharp Dressed Man" (1983). Over surf rock guitar twangs following a basic chord progression of Fm-E♭-B♭, Del Rey sings, "Love is mean, and love hurts / But I still remember that day we met in December". Low fidelity string instruments soar over the refrain, as Del Rey belts: "I will love you till the end of time."

Critical reception

"Blue Jeans" received acclaim from critics. Robert Copsey of Digital Spy said "Blue Jeans" was "packed with vintage American grandeur as well as Del Rey's own menacing vocal as she holds out for her once-upon-a-time James Dean-esque lover - though we sincerely hope he hasn't met a similar end." MTV reviewer, Nicole James, compared the possible death in "Blue Jeans" to the drowning of Jack in Titanic, adding:
"While we love LDR's whole "thing" she has going on, we're wondering when one of her videos is going to have a happy ending. How does she explain fairy tales to the kids she babysits? "And then Prince Charming kissed Sleeping Beauty and they lived happily ever after... until he got lazy, stopped bathing regularly and became clinically obsessed with World of Warcraft."
The Huffington Post noted that "Blue Jeans" was faithful to Del Rey's musical formula of nostalgia and realism, combined by artful and deep lyrics.

Slant Magazine said that Del Rey "uses her impressive range to dazzling effect on, "Blue Jeans", comparing her delinquent lover to both cancer and her favorite sweater in what seems like one swooning breath". NME said that 'Blue Jeans' lush Chris Isaak shades shimmer like sea-spume on Helena Christensen's naked thighs as Del Rey longs for her James Dean". Sputnikmusic stated that it's reminiscent of the music in Quentin Tarantino's films and named it one of the best song on the album. Beats Per Minute said that Blue Jeans' would probably be described by Del Rey as 'gangsta Spaghetti Western', but, aside from its most basic of forced rhymes ('Cause I'mma ride or die / Whether you fail or fly / Well shit at least you tried'), it is still a clever spin on genre, sounding unique, even inspired". DOA magazine said that "The lyrics-centric story-telling 'Blue Jeans' slows it down a bit with a deliberate, but swinging beat as Lana delves into a relationship where the guy is a 'Big dreams / gangsta...' and the girl wants him to stop living that lifestyle. Midway into the song the pace speeds up and Lana crams in a lot of lyrics, keeping the rhymes tight and the emotions high, until it dissipates into a dreamy chorus with Lana proclaiming 'I will love you till the end of time'". No Ripcord said that  "Just like in the dark ballad 'Blue Jeans', Del Rey sounds more comfortable when she tries to perform as a tough songstress". MusicOMH said that "'Video Games' and 'Blue Jeans', despite suffering Adele style levels of ubiquity in recent months, still sound achingly beautiful, both of them sounding like the saddest love songs ever written". Consequence of Sound said that "'Blue Jeans' and 'Video Games' inextricably link Del Rey's flaxen locks with starry-eyed classical instruments, providing the aural and visual irresistibility of a good montage".

In June 2018, Rolling Stone magazine named "Blue Jeans" the 35th-best song of the century thus far.

Music videos
Three music videos were directed and produced for the song. The first video was uploaded onto her YouTube account on September 9, 2011. Just like for the video for her single "Video Games", she gathered old archive clips from the internet and filmed herself in front of her webcam. The opening scene of the self-produced video contains a snippet of Lawrence Ferlinghetti reading the Lord's Prayer from the film, The Last Waltz and features footage from Australian photographer Nirrimi Joy Firebrace's "tender-hearted" project. Throughout the video, Del Rey splices vampy screencaps of herself mouthing the lyrics with clips from home videos and paparazzi footage she found on YouTube. Among them are snippets of old cartoons, Las Vegas, gas stations, and Tupac Shakur.

A second video titled "Blue Jeans (Live at the Premises)" was filmed and released online. In the video, Del Rey stands at a microphone in a bland room, accompanied by an electric guitarist. The Huffington Post writer Mallika Rao commented on Del Rey's performance in the video, "Her voice is still surprisingly deep. She still catches it in her throat in studied vulnerability. Her lashes are still thick as wings, her lips still enormous. The implicit reference to Nancy Sinatra and her ancestral line of gloomy jazz, which fans find exciting, and critics call derivative, is still at work."

A new official music video was directed by french artist Yoann Lemoine, who directed the video for the previous single "Born to Die". Bradley Soileau plays Del Rey's love interest in the video just as he did in the music video for "Born to Die". Filmed in early March 2012, and released on March 19, the video contains elements of film noir and is shot entirely in black and white. The video was compared to Nick Cave's murder ballads and the discography of Chris Isaak. Set by a poolside of a 1950s Hollywood home, Del Rey and Soileau reunite for a tragic love story. Accompanied by slo-mo brooding and smoking scenes, there is a possible drowning and the appearance of a crocodile. Critics called the video "moody" and "retro".

Live performances and media usage
On January 14, 2012, Del Rey performed the song on American late-night live television sketch comedy and variety show Saturday Night Live. The performance received a strong media reaction, many calling scrutiny to Del Rey's potential as an artist. She was later defended by Daniel Radcliffe and Saturday Night Live performer, Kristen Wiig, who later protected Del Rey by performing as her in a skit. Embarrassed by the overwhelming amount of negative public reaction, Del Rey was forced to cancel her world tour. Following the release of the high-budgeted secondary music video, Del Rey performed the song live on The Voice UK, where critics believe she redeemed the panned SNL performance.

It also was performed at Le Grand Journal in France, on January 30. On April 13, 2012, Del Rey performed the track on Italian talk show Le Invasioni Barbariche of La 7. On April 28, 2012, Del Rey performed the track on the first series of The Voice UK - with the performance airing the following day on BBC One.

The song was featured in Ringers "It's Easy to Cry When This Much Cash Is Involved" season 1 episode. It marks the second time a song by Del Rey was used in the series, the first being "Video Games". It is also used in a Nespresso commercial. It is also in a commercial for the University of Phoenix.

Bastille performed a mashup of "Blue Jeans" and Clint Mansell's "Lux Aeterna" on their mix tape, Other People's Heartache.

Track listing

7-inch vinyl
 "Blue Jeans" – 3:30

 "Carmen" – 4:08

Digital download
 "Blue Jeans" (Album version, remastered) – 3:30
 "Blue Jeans" (Gesaffelstein Remix) – 4:36
 "Blue Jeans" (Odd Future's the Internet Mix) – 4:01
 "Blue Jeans" (Blood Orange Remix) – 3:31

Remixes EP 1
 "Blue Jeans" (Remastered) – 3:30
 "Blue Jeans" (Gesaffelstein Remix) – 4:35
 "Blue Jeans" (Odd Future's the Internet Mix) – 4:00
 "Blue Jeans" (Blood Orange Remix) – 3:31

Remixes EP 2
 "Blue Jeans" (featuring Azealia Banks) (Smims & Belle Remix) – 3:01
 "Blue Jeans" (Gesaffelstein Remix) – 4:35
 "Blue Jeans" (RAC Mix) – 3:38
 "Blue Jeans" (Club Clique's Nothing Is Real Remix) – 4:11
 "Blue Jeans" (Kris Menace Remix) – 6:41
 "Blue Jeans" (Penguin Prison Remix) – 5:36

French Card Sleeve Single CD
 "Blue Jeans" (Album version)
 "Blue Jeans" (Club Clique's Nothing Is Real Remix)
 "Blue Jeans" (feat. Azealia Banks) (Smims & Belle Remix)
 "Blue Jeans" (Gesaffelstein Remix)
 "Blue Jeans" (Odd Future's the Internet Mix)
 "Blue Jeans" (Kris Menace Remix)
 "Blue Jeans" (Penguin Prison Remix)
 "Blue Jeans" (RAC Mix)
 "Blue Jeans" (Blood Orange Remix)

Blue Jeans Omid 16B Remixes
 Blue Jeans (Omid 16B Remix)
 Blue Jeans (Omid 16B Dub)
 Blue Jeans (Omid 16B Club Mix)
 Blue Jeans (Omid 16B Club Reprise)
 Video Games (Omid 16B Remix)
 Video Games (Omid 16B Instrumental Mix)
 Video Games (Omid 16B Instrumental)

Credits and personnel
Credits adapted from the liner notes of "Blue Jeans"
 Songwriting – Lana Del Rey, Emile Haynie and Dan Heath
 Producing – Emile Haynie
 Strings arranging and conducting – Dan Heath
 Mixing – Dan Grech Marguerat
 Assistant mixing – Duncan Fuller

Charts

Certifications

Awards

Release history

References

External links
 
 
 
 

2010s ballads
2011 songs
2012 singles
Black-and-white music videos
Interscope Records singles
Lana Del Rey songs
Music videos directed by Yoann Lemoine
Song recordings produced by Emile Haynie
Songs written by Emile Haynie
Songs written by Lana Del Rey
Torch songs